The sap beetles, also known as Nitidulidae, are a family of beetles.

They are small (2–6 mm) ovoid, usually dull-coloured beetles, with knobbed antennae. Some have red or yellow spots or bands. They feed mainly on decaying vegetable matter, over-ripe fruit, and sap. Sap beetles coexist with fungi species and live in habitats of coniferous trees. They are found all across Europe and Siberia and are the biggest nutudulid species known in those areas. There are a few pest species. An example of a pest species is the strawberry sap beetle that infest crops in Brazil between the months of August and February. 
 the picnic beetle, Glischrochilus quadrisignatus
 the dusky sap beetle, Carpophilus lugubris
 the strawberry sap beetle, Stelidota geminata
 the small hive beetle, Aethina tumida
The oldest unambiguous fossils of the family date to the Early Cretaceous, belonging to the genus Crepuraea from the Aptian aged Zaza Formation of Russia.

Classification

The family includes these genera:
 Subfamily Calonecrinae Kirejtshuk, 1982
 Subfamily Maynipeplinae Kirejtshuk, 1998
 Subfamily Epuraeinae Kirejtshuk, 1986
 Subfamily Carpophilinae Erichson, 1842 
 Carpophilus Stephens, 1830
 Epuraea Erichson, 1843
 Urophorus Murray, 1864
 Subfamily Amphicrossinae Kirejtshuk, 1986
 Subfamily Meligethinae Thomson, 1859 
 Meligethes Stephens, 1830 
 Pria Stephens, 1830 
 Subfamily Nitidulinae Latreille, 1802 
 Amphotis Erichson, 1843 
 Cychramus Kugelann, 1794 
 Cyllodes Erichson, 1843 
 Ipidia Erichson, 1843 
 Nitidula Fabricius, 1775 
 Omosita Erichson, 1843 
 Physoronia Reitter, 1884 
 Pocadius Erichson, 1843 
 Soronia Erichson, 1843 
 Thalycra Erichson, 1843
 Tumida Murray, 1867 
 Subfamily Cillaeinae Kirejtshuk & Audisio, 1986
 Cillaeopeplus Sharp, 1908
 Subfamily Cryptarchinae Thomson, 1859 
 Cryptarcha Shuckard, 1839 
 Glischrochilus Reitter, 1873 
 Pityophagus Shuckard, 1839 
 Subfamily Cybocephalinae Jacquelin du Val, 1858 (now frequently elevated to family status as Cybocephalidae)
 Cybocephalus Erichson, 1844 
 Pastillus Endrödy-Younga, 1962
 Subfamily Prometopinae
 Prometopia
 incertae sedis
 Apetinus
 Conotelus
 Cyrtostolus
 Eunitidula
 Eupetinus
 Gonioryctus
 Goniothorax
 Haptoncus
 Kateretes
 Nesapterus
 Nesopetinus
 Notopeplus
 Orthostolus
 Stelidota
 Urophorus

References

External links

 sap beetles of Florida on the UF / IFAS  Featured Creatures Web site
 Keys for the identification of British Nitidulidae (the pollen beetles)